Metrologia is a bimonthly journal dealing with the scientific aspects of metrology. It has been running since 1965 and has been published by the International Bureau of Weights and Measures since 1991. Since 2003 the journal has been published by IOP Publishing on behalf of the bureau. The journal covers the fundamentals of measurements, in particular those dealing with the seven base units of the International System of Units (metre, kilogram, second, ampere, kelvin, candela, mole) or proposals to replace them. 

The editors-in-chief are Sten Bergstrand (RISE Research Institutes of Sweden) and Janet Miles (International Bureau of Weights and Measures).

Abstracting and indexing
This journal is indexed by the following databases:
Science Citation Index Expanded
Scopus 
Inspec 
Chemical Abstracts Service 
Compendex 
GeoRef 
MathSciNet 
Astrophysics Data System 
VINITI Abstracts Journal

External links

Physics journals
IOP Publishing academic journals
Publications established in 1962
English-language journals
Metrology
Bimonthly journals